Svetlana Nikolayevna Kharitonova (30 January 1932, in Moscow — 8 January 2012, in Moscow)  was a Russian actress. She performed in more than fifty films between 1955 and 1991.

She was the first wife of actor Leonid Kharitonov.

Selected filmography

References

External links

Russian film actresses
Actresses from Moscow
1932 births
2012 deaths
Moscow Art Theatre School alumni
Gerasimov Institute of Cinematography alumni
Soviet film actresses